The men's 200 metre race was held for the third time at the 1908 Summer Olympics in London. The competition was held from 21 to 23 July 1908. NOCs could enter up to 12 athletes. 43 sprinters from 15 nations competed. The event was won by Robert Kerr of Canada, the first win by a nation other than the United States. Americans took silver (Robert Cloughen) and bronze (Nathaniel Cartmell), with Cartmell becoming the first person to win multiple 200 metres medals after taking earning silver in 1904.

Background

This was the third appearance of the event, which was not held at the first Olympics in 1896 but has been on the program ever since. Two of the five runners from the 1904 Games returned: silver medalist Nathaniel Cartmell of the United States and fifth-place finisher Robert Kerr of Canada (the only man not to reach the four-man final in 1904). Kerr had won three Canadian titles and the 1908 AAA title since the previous Games.

Austria, Belgium, Finland, Great Britain, Greece, Italy, the Netherlands, South Africa, and Sweden each made their debut in the event. The United States made its third appearance, the only nation to have competed at each edition of the 200 metres to date.

Competition format

There were three rounds: quarterfinals, semifinals, and a final. The quarterfinals consisted of 15 heats of between 1 and 5 athletes each; only the fastest man in each heat advanced to the semifinals. There were 4 semifinals, most with 4 runners but one with 3. Again, only the top athlete advanced. The final had 4 runners.

The race was run on a -mile track.

Records

These were the standing world and Olympic records (in seconds) prior to the 1908 Summer Olympics.

* unofficial 220 yards (= 201.17 m)

** straight course

Schedule

Results

Quarterfinals

The winner of each heat advanced, with all others eliminated. Heats were held on 21 July 1908.

Quarterfinal 1

George led by ten yards when he crossed the finish line.

Quarterfinal 2

In a tight race, Huff beat Duffy by less than two yards.

Quarterfinal 3

Roche won by a mere yard.

Quarterfinal 4

Cartmell won by about two yards.

Quarterfinal 5

Malfait had about a four-yard lead when he finished.

Quarterfinal 6

Laaftman won by two yards.

Quarterfinal 7

There was no competition for Radóczy in the seventh heat.

Quarterfinal 8

Cloughen had a comfortable six-yard lead when he crossed the finish line.

Quarterfinal 9

Hurdsfield led by a yard and a half at the finish.

Quarterfinal 10

Hamilton's margin of victory was three yards.

Quarterfinal 11

Kerr's victory was by about three yards.

Quarterfinal 12

Sherman led by two yards when he finished.

Quarterfinal 13

Reed won by two and a half yards.

Quarterfinal 14

Guttormsen was the second runner to win without competition.

Quarterfinal 15

The race was extremely tight until the final straightaway, where Hawkins pulled away to win.

Semifinals

The semifinal round was held on 22 July 1908, a day after the heats. The winners of each semifinal advanced to the final, with the other runners being knocked out of competition.

Semifinal 1

The first semifinal featured both of the runners who had won via walkover in the heats. There was very little room separating the lead three runners, with Kerr about nine inches in front of Hamilton and twelve ahead of Radoczy.

Semifinal 2

This all-American heat was also close, but not as close as the first. Cartmell won by about five feet.

Semifinal 3

Cloughen finally pulled ahead of Reed three-quarters of the way into the race, holding onto the lead until the finish.

Semifinal 4

Låftman was forced to scratch due to an injury. The three runners broke apart in the last ten metres, with Hawkins winning by a foot.

Final

The final was held on 23 July 1908. The top three were within two feet of each other, as Kerr's early lead evaporated in the straight. He was able to hang onto nine inches, however, and defeated Cloughen by that small margin.

Results summary

References

 
 
 

Men's 0200 metres
200 metres at the Olympics